Decisión Unánime (English: Unanimous Decision) is the tenth studio album recorded by Puerto Rican-American salsa singer-songwriter Víctor Manuelle. The album was released by Sony BMG Norte on May 9, 2006 (see 2006 in music). It produced three singles, "Nuestro Amor Se Ha Vuelto Ayer" feat. Yuridia which reached No. 8 on Billboard Hot Latin Songs and No. 1 on Billboard Tropical Airplay, "Maldita Suerte" feat. Sin Bandera, and "Nunca Había Llorado Así" feat. Don Omar. The album was certified Disco de Platino by the RIAA for shipments of 100,000 units in the United States.

Track listing 
 El Perdedor – 4:29 
 Nuestro Amor Se Ha Vuelto Ayer – 4:58
 Vamos De Nuevo (featuring Héctor Delgado, Yomo, & Mikey Genao) – 4:48
 Puerto Rico 2006 (featuring Eddie Palmieri) – 5:24   
 Maldita Suerte – 4:41   
 Nunca Había Llorado Así (featuring Don Omar) – 4:58  
 Dos Generaciones (featuring Eddie Palmieri) – 6:00
 ¿A Qué Te Supo? – 4:24   
 Cenizas – 4:22   
 Hazme Sentir – 4:52
 Nuestro Amor Se Ha Vuelto Ayer (Ballad Version) (featuring Yuridia) – 3:59
 Maldita Suerte (featuring Sin Bandera) (Ballad Version) – 4:16   
 Agradecimientos – 2:09

Charts

Weekly charts

Year-end charts

Sales and certifications

Awards/Nominations

See also
List of number-one Billboard Tropical Albums from the 2000s

References

2006 albums
Víctor Manuelle albums
Sony BMG Norte albums
Spanish-language albums